Amar fue su pecado, is a Mexican telenovela that aired on  Canal 4, Telesistema Mexicano in 1960. Directed by Rafael Banquells and starring Beatriz Aguirre.

Cast 
 Beatriz Aguirre
 Magda Guzmán
 Ramón Gay 
 Javier Guerrero
 Consuelo Guerrero de Luna
 Graciela Doring
 Francisco Jambrina
 Enrique del Castillo
 Roberto Araya
 Milagros de Real
 Tere Mondragón

Production 
Original Story: Mimi Bechelani
Director: Rafael Banquells
Manager cameras: Leopoldo Labra

References 

1960 telenovelas
Mexican telenovelas
Televisa telenovelas
Television shows set in Mexico City
1960 Mexican television series debuts
1960 Mexican television series endings
Spanish-language telenovelas